The 1917 Basingstoke by-election was held on 25 October 1917.  The by-election was held due to the incumbent Conservative MP, Arthur Salter, becoming a Judge on the High Court of Justice.  It was won by the Conservative candidate Sir Auckland Geddes, who was unopposed due to a War-time electoral pact.

References

1917 elections in the United Kingdom
1917 in England
20th century in Hampshire
October 1917 events
Basingstoke
By-elections to the Parliament of the United Kingdom in Hampshire constituencies
Unopposed by-elections to the Parliament of the United Kingdom (need citation)